Eburia bonairensis is a species of beetle in the family Cerambycidae, that is endemic to Suriname.

References

bonairensis
Beetles described in 1968
Endemic fauna of Suriname
Beetles of South America